Samuel King (January 24, 1749 − December 20, 1819) was an American painter of miniature portraits and instructor.

Early life
Samuel King was born about January 24, 1749 in Newport, Rhode Island. His father, Benjamin King, made navigational and mathematical instruments. King received training to become a house painter in Boston, Massachusetts, which became one of his many occupations.

Career
King had pursued several vocations before beginning his artistic career. He painted houses, made frames, decorated carriages and made mathematical and navigational instruments. After his marriage in 1770, King became increasingly interested in art, but also continued to make instruments.

He made a miniature portrait painting Reverend Ezra Stiles in 1770, which is now part of the Metropolitan Museum of Art's collection. Stiles, who performed King's marriage ceremony, went on to become the president of Yale College. The following year he painted Stiles' portrait on canvas.

King taught artists Ann Hall, Charles Bird King, Edward Greene Malbone, and Washington Allston. Malbone had been encouraged by King to become an artist. Hall visited Newport to receive lessons from King.

He created a transparency for the Rhode Island State House in 1783, which was "probably" illuminated from torches placed behind the large transparency.

Personal life
King was married to Amy Vernon in 1770 by Reverend Ezra Stiles. She was the daughter of a successful merchant, Samuel Vernon.

He died December 20, 1819 in Newport.

Gallery

References

1748 births
1819 deaths
American portrait painters
Portrait miniaturists
Artists from Newport, Rhode Island
People of colonial Rhode Island
18th-century American painters
18th-century American male artists
19th-century American painters
Painters from Rhode Island
American male painters
19th-century American male artists